Dedepınarı can refer to:

 Dedepınarı, Elâzığ
 Dedepınarı, Yüreğir